The Mona least gecko (Sphaerodactylus monensis) is a species of lizard in the family Sphaerodactylidae. It is endemic to Isla de Mona of Puerto Rico.

References

Sphaerodactylus
Reptiles of Puerto Rico
Endemic fauna of Puerto Rico
Reptiles described in 1901